The Lahmiales are an order of fungi in the Ascomycota, or sac fungi. The order has not been assigned to any class (incertae sedis). The taxon is monotypic and contains a single family, the Lahmiaceae, which in turn contains the single genus Lahmia.

The genus name of Lahmia is in honour of Johann Gottlieb Franz-Xaver Lahm (1811-1888), who was a German clergyman and botanist (Lichenology and
Mycology).
The genus of Lahmia was circumscribed by Gustav Wilhelm Koerber in Parerga Lichenol on page 281 in 1861.

References

Pezizomycotina
Ascomycota orders